Dhulghat railway station is a small railway station in Amravati district, Maharashtra, India. Its code is DGT. It serves Deulghat town. The station consists of one platform. The platform is not well sheltered. It lacks many facilities including water and sanitation.

Dhulghat Spiral is a unique spiral located on Akola–Ratlam metre-gauge section of South Central Railway of India. It is also called 'Char Cha Akda' in Marathi and 'Char Ka Aankda' in Hindi.

References

Nanded railway division
Railway stations in Amravati district